Choctaw Beach, Florida is a community located west of Freeport, Florida and Portland, Florida and east of Niceville, Florida. It is located along the shores of the Choctawhatchee Bay.

The Walton County Fire Station 10 is located in Choctaw Beach. The fire station is usually manned by only two firefighters at a time.

References 

Cities in Walton County, Florida